
Indira may refer to:

People
 Indira (name)

Films and books 
 Indira, an 1873 novella by Bankim Chandra Chatterjee
 Indira (film), directed by Suhasini Manirathnam

Others 
 Indira is a byname of Lakshmi, the Hindu goddess of prosperity, good luck, and beauty
 Indira Col, a col in the Karakoram mountains
 Indira Marathon, an Indian national annual full marathon held in Allahabad
 Indira Mount, an Indian seabed mountain situated in Antarctic Ocean
 Indira Point, an India southernmost tip in the Andaman and Nicobar Islands

See also 
 Indra (disambiguation)